Francis Adjei is a Ghanaian professional footballer who currently plays for Karela United F.C. in the Ghana Premier League.

Career
Francis Adjei has played for several Ghanaian teams including Karela United and Ashanti Gold as a midfielder.

International career
In November 2013, coach Maxwell Konadu  invited him to be a part of the Ghana squad for the 2013 WAFU Nations Cup. He helped the team to a first-place finish after Ghana beat Senegal by three goals to one.

References

Living people
Ghanaian footballers
WAFU Nations Cup players
Association football midfielders
1996 births